Skogn may refer to:

Places
Skogn, a village in Levanger municipality in Trøndelag county, Norway
Skogn (municipality), a former municipality (1838-1962) in the old Nord-Trøndelag county, Norway
Skogn Station, a railway station in Levanger municipality in Trøndelag county, Norway
Skogn Folk High School, a Norwegian folk high school in Levanger municipality in Trøndelag county, Norway

Other
Skogn IL, a sports association in Levanger municipality in Trøndelag county, Norway